Sadia Khateeb is an Indian actress who works in Hindi films. She made her acting debut with Vidhu Vinod Chopra's film Shikara (2020) for which she received Filmfare Award for Best Female Debut nomination. Khateeb has since starred in Raksha Bandhan (2022).

Early life
Khateeb was born in a in Bhaderwah town of Doda district of Jammu and Kashmir, India

Career
Khateeb made her acting debut in Hindi films with the 2020 film Shikara, a drama by filmmaker Vidhu Vinod Chopra. The film narrates a love story at the peak of Insurgency in Jammu and Kashmir and the subsequent exodus of Kashmiri Pandits. She portrayed a medical student opposite Aadil Khan and received praises for her role. Pallabi Dey of Times Of India wrote "Sadia, with her infectious smile, is a natural in portions where she is playing the younger part". 

Khateeb next appeared in Raksha Bandhan portraying Akshay Kumar's sister. The film received mixed reviews. A critic for Bollywood Hungama rated the film 3.5 out of 5 stars and wrote "The Akshay Kumar starrer Raksha Bandhan is a touching family saga, with a highly emotional second half that uplifts the film". She received praises for her role, with critics stating "Sadia Khateeb leaves the maximum impact and looks quite stunning".

Khateeb will next appear alongside John Abraham in The Diplomat.

Filmography

Films

Awards and nominations

References

External links 

1997 births
Living people
Dogra people
Indian Muslims
Indian film actresses
21st-century Indian actresses